Sinigang is a Filipino soup or stew characterized by its sour and savory taste. It is most often associated with tamarind (Filipino: sampalok), although it can use other sour fruits and leaves as the souring agent. It is one of the more popular dishes in Filipino cuisine. The soup is usually accompanied by rice. In 2021, sinigang was rated as the world's best vegetable soup by TasteAtlas.

Origin
Sinigang means "stewed [dish]", it is a nominalized form of the Tagalog verb sigang, "to stew". While present nationwide, sinigang is seen to be culturally Tagalog in origin, thus the similar sour stews and soups found in the Visayas and Mindanao (like linarang) are regarded as different dishes and differ in the ingredients used. Fish sauce is a common condiment for the stew.

Ingredients

Sinigang is most often associated with tamarind in modern times, but it originally referred to any meat or seafood cooked in a sour and acidic broth, similar to but differentiated from paksiw (which uses vinegar). Other variations of the dish derive their sourness from native ingredients. These souring agents include unripe mangoes, butterfly tree leaves (alibangbang), citruses (including the native calamansi and biasong), santol, bilimbi (kamias or iba), gooseberry tree fruits (karmay), binukaw fruits (also batuan), and libas fruits, among others. Guava, introduced to the Philippines via the Manila galleons is also used. Seasoning powder or bouillon cubes with a tamarind base are commercial alternatives to using natural fruits.

Sinigang typically uses meat or seafood (e.g., fish, pork, beef, shrimp, or chicken) stewed with tamarind, tomatoes, garlic, and onions. Other vegetables commonly used in the making of sinigang include okra, taro corms (gabi adds a starchy component to the dish and thickens the broth), white radish (labanós), water spinach (kangkóng), yardlong beans (sitaw) and eggplant (talóng). Most Filipinos like to cook sinigang with long green peppers in order to enhance the taste and add a little spice to the dish. Another variation includes adding locally made miso.

Sinigang variations

Sinigáng sa misô  - Sinigang with miso added to the soup as the umami element, usually with a tamarind base
Sinigáng sa bayabas - Sinigang that uses guava as the sour soup base
Sinigang sa mangga - Sinigang that uses unripe mango as the sour soup base
Sinigang sa kalamansi - Sinigang that uses calamansi or lemon as the sour soup base
Sinigáng na isdâ - Fish sinigang
Sinigang sa pakwan - Sinigang that uses watermelon together with tamarind as the sour soup base
Sinigáng na hipon - Shrimp or Prawn sinigang 
Sinigang na baka - Beef sinigang
 Seafood sinigang - Fish, shrimp, squid, sea shells are combined in this soup 
Bule baluga - A variant of sinigang from the  Aeta people of Pampanga that uses lima beans (bule) and is soured with alibangbang (butterfly tree) leaves. The name is controversial as baluga is considered by some as derogatory to the Aeta.

Similar dishes

Sinampalukang manók or sinampalukan is technically not a variation of sinigang, as the chicken has to be sautéed in ginger first instead of all the ingredients being placed simultaneously into the pot and brought to a boil. Sinampalukan is also distinguished by its use of shredded tamarind leaves, and is usually made together with ginger, onions, tomatoes, eggplant and other vegetables.

Other Filipino dishes that are similar to sinigang but distinct include pinangat na isda from Southern Luzon and linarang from Cebu. Both of which also use sour fruits but are restricted to fish or seafood and differ in the other ingredients used.

There are also similar soured beef stews. They include the cansi from the Western Visayas islands which use beef and breadfruit and is soured with batuan or bilimbi fruits. Because it resembles a cross between bulalo and sinigang it is sometimes known as sinigang na bulalo. Another soured beef stew is sinanglaw from Ilocos which is soured with bilimbi or tamarind, but is unique in that it also includes bitter ingredients like bitter gourd or bile, as is common in Ilocano cuisine.

Beyond Philippines

Malaysia

Around the east coast of Peninsular Malaysia, particularly in the states of Kelantan and Terengganu, there is a dish called singgang that is considered as a close resemblance to sinigang. The common ingredients found in singgang are lemongrass, galangal, garlic, chili and asam gelugur as souring agent. Either budu or tempoyak would also sometimes be added to further flavourize the dish. Terengganu's singgang and Kelantan's singgang differs through an addition of turmeric into the former.

Meanwhile, on the west coast of Peninsular Malaysia, another dish that is thought to be similar to singgang is called pindang.

See also
 Cansi
Canh chua
 Hot and sour soup
 Sayur asem
 Pindang
 Tom yum
 List of soups
 List of stews
 Filipino cuisine

References

Further reading

 Eckhardt, Robyn and David Hagerman. (2007-02-15). Why Not Sinigang?. Retrieved 2010-08-02 from the EatingAsia food blog.
 Fernandez, Doreen. (1976). Why Sinigang?. In Gilda Cordero-Fernando. The Culinary Culture of the Philippines. Manila: Bancom Audiovision Corporation. pp. 24–29.
 Perez, Irene C. (2010-07-01). Why piping-hot ‘sinigang’ is the national dish. Philippine Daily Inquirer. Retrieved 2010-08-02.

Philippine soups
Philippine stews
National dishes